= Bottom Brook Granite =

Granite formation in Newfoundland, Canada

- Stratigraphic range: Late Silurian – Middle Devonian
- Type: Formation
- Unit of: North Bay Granite Suite

Lithology
- Primary: Granite (Plutonic)

Location
- Region: Newfoundland and Labrador
- Country: Canada
- Occurrence of the Bottom Brook Granite in southeastern Newfoundland

The Bottom Brook Granite is a formation cropping out in Newfoundland.
